Los misterios del amor (English title: The mysteries of love) is a Venezuelan telenovela written by Alberto Barrera Tyszka and produced by Venevisión in 2009.

On May 13, 2008, Venevisión started broadcasting Los misterios del amor weekdays at 9:00pm, replacing La vida entera. The last episode was broadcast on October 8, 2009.

Sabrina Seara and Juan Carlos García star as the main protagonists, while Eileen Abad and Eduardo Orozco star as villains.

Plot
Francisca Náranjo is a nurse who is hopelessly in love with Juan Andrés Róman, the director of the clinic where she works. Juan Andrés has never noticed or paid any attention to Francisca. However, through a twist of fate, Juan Andrés meets a taxi driver named Jason Martínez who looks exactly like him. Juan Andrés convinces Jason to take his place for a single afternoon so that he can obtain the opportunity to handle personal issues. It is through this exchange that Jason falls in love with Francisca the moment he sees her. Jason is completely convinced that Francisca is the love of his life.

But what seemed to be a simple game of amusement for Juan Andrés turns into a complete nightmare when he is forced to go into hiding after a series of unexpected circumstances, therefore leaving Jason to occupy his life and in a position which he cannot handle. Meanwhile, the love between Francisca and Jason continues to grow. Little does she know that the man she thinks she has finally fallen in love with isn't Juan Andrés.

Cast

Main
 Sabrina Seara as Francisca Naranjo
 Juan Carlos García as Jasón Martínez/ Juan Andrés Román
 Eileen Abad as Isabella Román
 Alba Roversi as Déborah Salazar/ Francisco Gutiérrez
 Eduardo Orozco as Octavio Urbaneja
 Iván Tamayo as Emilio Pimentel

Supporting

 Mónica Pasqualotto as Maricruz Fernández de Santéliz 
 Jerónimo Gil as Edwin Santéliz
 Albi De Abreu as Gabriel Acosta
 Wanda D'Isidoro as Vanessa García de Acosta
 Ana Maria Simón as Laura
 Ámbar Díaz as Zuleyma
 Rhandy Piñango as Vladimir Quintana
 Deyalit López as Amarelys
 Carmen Alicia Lara as Nayibe Martínez
 Giancarlo Pasqualotto as Daniel
 Catherine Cardozo as Lisbeth
 Flor Elena González as Diana Román
 Nattalie Cortéz as Alicia Naranjo
 Aura Rivas as Trina
 Maria Antonieta Ardila as Carlita
 Ly Jonaitis as Karolina
 Freddy Aquino as Wilfer Linares
 Hernan Iturbe as Orlando
 Sandra Yajure as Carmen
 Juan Miguel Hernández as Kabubi
 Michelle Nassef as Jimena Pimentel
 Cristhian González as Christian
 Karin Hernández as Shirley
 Samuel Egui as Kruger Martinez
 Ameliè Redondo as Sofía
 Jessika Grau as Manuela García
 Ana Karina Casanova as Mercedes
 Antonio Delli as Marcelo
 Eva Blanco as Mireya
 Yulene Iturrate as Abogada de Jasón
 Carlos Guillermo Haydon as Rodrigo Delgado

References

External links
 

2009 telenovelas
Venevisión telenovelas
2009 Venezuelan television series debuts
2009 Venezuelan television series endings
Venezuelan telenovelas
Spanish-language telenovelas
Television shows set in Caracas